Bradley Jay Anderson (May 14, 1924 – August 30, 2015) was an American cartoonist and creator of the comic strip Marmaduke.

Early life and career
Anderson graduated from Brocton Central School in Brocton, New York in 1942 and then served with the United States Navy until 1946, during which time he submitted cartoons to be published in several Navy publications. Initially aspiring to be an industrial designer, Anderson attended Syracuse University on the G.I. Bill; in 1951 he graduated with a B.F.A. in Fine Arts with a major in advertising. Anderson went to work for Ball & Grier, an advertising agency in Utica, New York; however, in 1953, Anderson decided to focus on freelance magazine cartooning. From 1954 to 1966, Anderson drew the comic strip Grandpa's Boy.

Marmaduke
Brad Anderson is best known for creating the comic strip Marmaduke in 1954, which he continued to draw until his death. According to Anderson, "During the time, I was drawing various types of dogs in my magazine cartoons, I was also trying to develop a dog character specifically for eventual newspaper syndication [....] you couldn't see the eyes of my shaggy dogs, so as I thought more about it I decided I wanted a dog where I could have an expressive face". Anderson, who said that he drew on Laurel and Hardy routines for his ideas, received the National Cartoonists Society Newspaper Panel Cartoon Award for Marmaduke in 1978.

Anderson made appearances on Animal Planet's Breed All About It and Dogs 101.

Anderson's studio was re-created for the National Comedy Center in Jamestown, New York, which opened on August 1, 2018. The donated studio includes Anderson's original drawing board and materials.

Personal life
Anderson was married and had one daughter, Christine, and three sons, Craig, Paul and Mark with his wife Barbara. Anderson died on August 30, 2015 at The Woodlands, Texas at the age of 91 of congestive heart failure. He was buried at Portland Evergreen Cemetery in Portland, New York. A nearby statue of Anderson and a dog representing Marmaduke was dedicated in 2016.

References

Strickler, Dave. Syndicated Comic Strips and Artists, 1924–1995: The Complete Index. Cambria, California: Comics Access, 1995. .

External links
Marmaduke at GoComics
Brad Anderson Collection at Billy Ireland Cartoon Library & Museum
Billy Ireland Cartoon Library & Museum Art Database

1924 births
2015 deaths
American comic strip cartoonists
Artists from New York (state)
Inkpot Award winners
People from Brocton, New York
People from Jamestown, New York
Syracuse University College of Visual and Performing Arts alumni
United States Navy personnel of World War II